William Breck Torrance (1888 – 25 July 1956) was a Scottish amateur golfer who played in the early 20th century. Torrance's best performance came in the 1927 Open Championship when he tied for tenth place. His younger brother, Tony, was also a noted amateur golfer.

Early life
Torrance was born in Edinburgh in 1888.

1927 Open Championship
The 1927 Open Championship was the 62nd Open Championship, held 13–15 July at the Old Course at St Andrews in St Andrews, Scotland. Amateur Bobby Jones successfully defended the title with a dominating six stroke victory, the second of his three victories at the Open Championship.

Death
Torrance died suddenly at his home in Edinburgh on 25 July 1956.

Team appearances
Walker Cup (representing Great Britain): 1922
England–Scotland Amateur Match (representing Scotland): 1922 (winners), 1923 (winners), 1924, 1926, 1927 (tie), 1928, 1930
Ireland–Scotland Amateur Match (representing Scotland): 1928 (winners), 1929 (winners), 1930 (tie)

References

Scottish male golfers
Amateur golfers
Golfers from Edinburgh
1888 births
1956 deaths